Super Smash Bros. Ultimate is a crossover fighting video game for the Nintendo Switch. Players control one of over 80 characters drawn from Nintendo and third-party game franchises, and try to knock their opponents out of an arena. Each player has a percentage meter which rises when they take damage; characters become easier to knock into the air or out of bounds as the percentage increases. Like with all other Super Smash Bros. games, Ultimates competitive scene features both Singles (1v1) and Doubles (2v2) tournament, with Ultimate introducing a new form of 1v1 competition named "Squad Strike" in which the players switch between different characters during a same game; Singles competition is largely seen as the most prestigious form of Super Smash Bros. competition.

Games in the Super Smash Bros. franchise have been played competitively since the early 2000s, but the inclusion of Super Smash Bros. Melee at the 2013 edition of Evolution Championship Series (Evo), a major multi-game tournament, was seen as a turning point; after Evo 2013, competitive Smash saw an increase in tournaments, media coverage, and attention from Nintendo. Super Smash Bros. Ultimate is the fifth officially released Smash Bros. title; all five have been played competitively, in addition to a fan-made mod of Super Smash Bros. Brawl, Project M. Many of the top-ranked Ultimate players were highly ranked in previous Smash Bros. games, in particular Super Smash Bros. for Wii U.

Ultimate was released on December 7, 2018, to critical acclaim, and broke sales records in the United States and Europe en route to becoming the best-selling fighting game of all time. The release of Ultimate saw an increase in the number of people entering and watching tournaments, leading to an increase in available prize money compared to Super Smash Bros. for Wii U. However, unlike many other developers, Nintendo does not contribute funds to tournament prize pools. As a result, the prize pools for Ultimate are still significantly smaller than those of other fighting games. The Ultimate tournament at Evo 2019 had just over 3,500 entrants, which made it the largest offline tournament held in Smash Bros. franchise history. However, its prize pool of $35,300 - $10 from each player's registration fee - was smaller than that of Street Fighter V, which had only 1,951 entrants, but whose developer Capcom contributed $50,000 to the prize pool. Additionally, Japanese law significantly limits cash prizes for esports events held in that country. Some Japanese tournaments use legal loopholes to provide cash prizes, while others offer non-cash prizes, including tickets for players to attend American tournaments. Nintendo received widespread criticism after Ultimate was the only game at Evo Japan 2020 not to offer a cash prize. While other games' developers joined the Japan Esports Union, allowing them to offer prizes, Nintendo did not, and instead awarded the winner a Switch controller emblazoned with a gold Smash Bros. logo. In a January 2020 interview, Nintendo president Shuntaro Furukawa indicated that the company did not intend to support esports, stating that the company's focus was on inclusiveness, and their ability to create games that many people want to play, without the need for prize money, was one of Nintendo's strengths.

Smash Bros. tournaments are generally seeded so that the best players do not face off against each other until the later stages of a tournament. The most authoritative ranking of Super Smash Bros. Ultimate players is the Panda Global Rankings Ultimate (PGRU). The PGRU groups tournaments into one of four tiers – S, A, B, and C – based on the number of entrants, with S being the most prestigious tier and C the least. Tournaments can also qualify for higher tiers by having a large number of highly ranked players, even if the overall number of entrants is lower. Tournaments held outside of the United States require fewer entrants to qualify for higher tiers, owing to their smaller competitive communities. S-tier and A-tier events are frequently called "Majors", with S-tier tournaments sometimes called "Supermajors"; winning a Major is largely considered the most prestigious accomplishment in Ultimate. This list contains all PGRU Majors – S- and A-tier events – from the release of Ultimate through the present.

PGRU S-tier tournaments 

 

The following is a list of results from Super Smash Bros. Ultimate tournaments considered S-tier by the Panda Global Rankings Ultimate:

PGRU A-tier tournaments 
 

The following is a list of results from Super Smash Bros. Ultimate tournaments considered A-tier by the Panda Global Rankings Ultimate:

Notes

References

Ultimate